Four Oaks Place is a complex of skyscrapers in Uptown Houston, Texas, United States. Managed by CBRE, the complex includes the 420 ft (128 m) 1330 Post Oak Boulevard (sometimes referred to as the Aon Building), the 25-story 351 ft (107m) BHP Billiton Tower (1360 Post Oak Boulevard), Wells Fargo Tower (1300 Post Oak Boulevard), and the Interfin Building (1400 Post Oak Boulevard). The buildings were designed by Cesar Pelli & Associates Architects.

History
In 1993 BHP Petroleum, the US subsidiary of BHP, announced that its U.S. headquarters was moving from San Felipe Plaza to the Cigna Tower (1360 Post Oak Blvd.). Two hundred clerical and professional employees moved into the building.

In the 1990s Weatherford Enterra (now Weatherford International) had its corporate headquarters in 1360 Post Oak. By 2000 Weatherford moved to a new location in Houston.

In 1999 Cushman & Wakefield, a realty firm, moved its Houston office from the Wells Fargo Tower into the America Tower in the American General Center in Neartown. By 2008 and as of 2009 Cushman & Wakefield's Houston office is now in the 1330 Post Oak building.

As of 2007 the owner of Four Oaks Place is considering plans to develop a fifth tower for the complex.

As of Feb 22, 2014, the foundation was poured for Five Oaks Place. The foundation consists of 2.5 million pounds of reinforcing steel and over 8,000 cu. yards of concrete.

Tenants
The BHP Billiton Tower houses BHP's Houston Marketing Office.

The complex has two consulates in the Wells Fargo Tower: those of Chile and Italy. In addition the Consulate-General of Germany in Houston resides in 1330 Post Oak.

Gallery

See also

References

External links

Four Oaks Place
Emporis

Skyscraper office buildings in Houston
Office buildings completed in 1983
César Pelli buildings